Scott Michael Sanderson (born July 25, 1974) is a former American football offensive lineman. He played college football at Washington State University in Pullman, where he was an All-American in 1996 under head coach Mike Price. Sanderson was selected in the third round of the 1997 NFL Draft by the Tennessee Oilers, and appeared mostly on special teams. He later played for the New Orleans Saints and Chicago Bears.

References

External links
 

1974 births
Living people
Sportspeople from Walnut Creek, California
Washington State Cougars football players
Tennessee Titans players
New Orleans Saints players
Chicago Bears players
American football offensive tackles
Players of American football from California